Panganiban, officially the Municipality of Panganiban, is a 5th class municipality in the province of Catanduanes, Philippines. According to the 2020 census, it has a population of 9,713 people.

It is formerly known as Payo.

Etymology
Although the original name was Payo, this town has changed name from Panganiban to Payo and back again. During the last term of the late assemblyman Francisco Perfecto, Panganiban became Payo again on April 20, 1957, under Republic Act No. 1654. Congressman Jose M. Alberto (through Republic Act 2122 enacted without executive approval April 15, 1959) changed the name to Panganiban again by which it is officially known at present.

Legend has it that a boatload of seafarers from some village in the south-eastern mainland of Luzon was shipwrecked onto the shore of what is now Panganiban. The village headman, or “Payo” as he was called by the villagers, was among the shipwrecked and no one was able to return to the home village. Migrating villagers, years later, were able to ascertain the fate of their lost kinsmen when they came upon the remains of the wrecked sailboat. They settled in the place and called it “Payo” in memory of their ill-fated headman.

History

On January 1, 1921, Gov. Gen. Francis B. Harrison signed into law Executive Order No. 55 officially segregating the municipality from Viga; thenceforth she was called Panganiban, in honor of Jose Blanca Panganiban who stood as sponsor during the inauguration. She is also known as Payo, after a native herb, hamapayo and due to its brevity, the name Payo is more commonly used.

About 9,500 inhabitants populate her 7,772 km2 area of vast plains and valleys painted gold with rice, of hills verdant with abaca and coconuts, and of rugged coastlines thick with mangroves. Deep within her bowels lie the richest coal deposits in the island, untapped as yet.

The pioneers were navigators and traders on commercial expeditions, descendants of the first wave of settlers from Borneo, Malay and China. In the early 13th century, another wave of seafarers, coming from southern Luzon mainland, got lost in storm, ventured inward into the mouth of Payo River and there found an Eden—and so they stayed and called this home.

The Spanish colonizers who came around 1573 indelibly left their thumbprint in Christianity to the character of Payonhon such that save for a few Christian sect. Catholicism remains the predominant religion. The church of St. James the Greater whose massive edifice built in the 18th century still stands, lording it over the other institutions serves as a testament to the people's ingenuity and perseverance; they who fashioned the building out of limestone and local materials using their own hands—a labor that took them 15–25 years to finish. Only a people of remarkably deep and unwavering faith could do such a feat. And this faith did not fail them through a series of crisis during the Japanese occupation. Miraculously, while the rest of the country reeled under atrocities committed by the Japanese, the Payonhons were relatively treated with civility by their captors until the aliens were driven out of town and annihilated by the guerrillas in Banquerohan in ruthless ambush on April 19, 1945.

Since its separation from Viga in 1921, Panganiban occupied one half of the Northern chunk of the province with the other half left to Viga in 1952, when its biggest barrio of Bagamanoc became a separate municipality of Panganiban shrunk into other slice of territory as it is now.

When the Certeza Survey came up in the 1970s, its territory was trampled upon with impunity as some of the sitios were transferred to the jurisdiction of its mother or daughter municipalities. The remaining 6,000 hectares of land area of Panganiban, 400 hectares are rice lands; 300 hectares swamp and the rest are forest of varying denudations.

Its church, built in 1720–1725, has never been substantially rebuilt. It succumbed to the earthquake of January 11, 1928, its east wall was ripped beyond repair and ugly cracks were opened in several places. The end and side walls were torn apart at the north-east corner leaving an eight-inch opening from top to bottom. A stronger earthquake may send the wall a crumbling and the church goers including the priest scamper in panic out of the church at the slightest tremor.

Tenacious and resilient as the typical Catandunganon, the town folks depend much their livelihood on fishing and agriculture.

The intermittent devastation of their money crops-abaca and copra and the inadequate facilities of irrigation system had been the main causes of the economic depression of the residents. The livelihood projects being undertaken by the government on the case-to-case basis are the only means, which the people pin their hope to bail out their miseries.

The town population of about 8,000 as of 1975 eventually decreased as a result of migration to the mainland Bicol and other part of the country and abroad, as well as, to seek for economic opportunities.

The literacy of the people is quite high due to presence of a National Vocational College in town since 1948.

Political Background
Payo had been a barrio of Viga up to January 1, 1921, when it became Panganiban (named after Jose Blanca Panganiban who was its sponsor during the inaugural ceremony) and ceased to be part of Viga per executive order. Pedro Urgel was appointed Presidente. In the ensuing election of 1922, the electorate repudiated the administration that gave Panganiban its “independence” and voted into office a political maverick who implanted the nucleus of a political opposition that was to hold sway throughout the north-eastern part, if not the whole of Catanduanes. Ignacio Aquino was the name of the first elected local executive.

Most outstanding accomplishment by local executives is the construction of the diversion canal that by-passed the local cemetery and saved it from the scouring floodwaters of the Payo River.

Geography

It is situated on the northern part of Catanduanes, with its eastern part facing the Pacific Ocean. It is bounded on the north by the municipality of Bagamanoc, on the south by the municipality of Viga, and on the west by the municipality of Caramoran which is covered by a dense forest.

Its distance from the adjacent towns of Viga and Bagamanoc are 5 and 4 kilometers, respectively.

Bagamanoc was created from barrios of Quigaray, Hinipagan, Sukhan in the island of Panay; Lati, in the island of Lati; Bacac, Hinipaan, Bugao, Minaili and Bagamanoc of the municipality of Panganiban by virtue of Republic Act No. 491 which was approved on June 12, 1950.

The municipal councils of Bagamanoc and Panganiban agreed on the boundary of the two towns on June 12, 1952. The agreement was approved by the provincial council of Catanduanes on July 12, 1952. The Congress formalized the agreement by passing Republic Act No. 1038 which was approved on June 12, 1954. The boundary was stated thus:

Barangays
Panganiban is politically subdivided into 23 barangays.

Climate

Panganiban has a tropical rainforest climate (Af) with heavy to very heavy rainfall year-round and with extremely heavy rainfall in November and December.

Demographics

Economy

References

External links

 [ Philippine Standard Geographic Code]
Philippine Census Information
Municipality of Panganiban, Catanduanes

Municipalities of Catanduanes